The 70th Infantry Division ("Trailblazers") was a unit of the United States Army in World War II, spearheading the Seventh United States Army's drive into Germany, south of Saarbrücken.

Activated at Camp Adair, Oregon, in 1943, the 70th Division served throughout World War II in the European Theater of Operations, the division was deactivated in October 1945 at Camp Kilmer, New Jersey following its return to the United States.

The name "Trailblazers" originated from the pioneers moving west into Oregon and "blazing" trails through the thick evergreen forests of the Pacific Northwest. The 70th Infantry Division adopted the "Trailblazer" title when they were activated in 1943. They became known as the Trailblazer Division.

World War II
Activated: 15 June 1943.
July 1944 moved to Fort Leonard Wood, Missouri
Overseas: Task Force Herren-December 1944; Support Troops-8 January 1945.
Campaigns: Ardennes-Alsace, Rhineland, Central Europe.
Days of combat: 86.
Distinguished Unit Citations: 1.
Awards: DSC-12; SS-228 (4 clusters); LM-7; SM-16; BS-430 (14 clusters); Military Cross (UK)-1; AM-20; Meritorious Unit Citation-3.
Commanders: Major General John E. Dahlquist (June 1943 – July 1944), Major General. Allison J. Barnett (July 1944 – July 1945), Brigadier General Thomas W. Herren (July 1945 – October 1945).
Returned to U.S.: 10 October 1945.
Inactivated: 11 October 1945 at Camp Kilmer, New Jeresy

Order of battle

 Headquarters, 70th Infantry Division
 274th Infantry Regiment
 275th Infantry Regiment
 276th Infantry Regiment
 Headquarters and Headquarters Battery, 70th Infantry Division Artillery
 725th Field Artillery Battalion (155 mm)
 882nd Field Artillery Battalion (105 mm)
 883rd Field Artillery Battalion (105 mm)
 884th Field Artillery Battalion (105 mm)
 270th Engineer Combat Battalion
 370th Medical Battalion
 379th AG Battalion
 70th Cavalry Reconnaissance Troop (Mechanized)
 Headquarters, Special Troops, 70th Infantry Division
 Headquarters Company, 70th Infantry Division
 770th Ordnance Light Maintenance Company
 70th Quartermaster Company
 570th Signal Company
 Military Police Platoon
 Band
 70th Counterintelligence Corps Detachment

Combat chronicle

The three infantry regiments of the 70th Infantry Division, the 274th, 275th and 276th, landed at Marseille, France, 10–15 December 1944, and were formed into Task Force Herren under command of deputy division commander, Thomas W. Herren, before the arrival of the remainder of the division on 18 January 1945. Task Force Herren took over defensive positions along the west bank of the Rhine, 28 December 1944, in the vicinity of Bischwiller, south of Haguenau Forest. Elements took part in the fight to stop the German Operation Nordwind, and struck at the enemy at Philippsbourg and at Wingen between Bitche and Hagenau. In mid-January 1945, the task force moved to an area directly south of Saarbrücken, where it carried out reconnaissance and combat patrols, and improved its defensive positions. Upon the arrival of the remainder of the division, Task Force Herren was dissolved.

The division continued patrolling and combat raids as it made preparations for an offensive drive in mid-February. On 17 February 1945, the division attacked just below the Saar River. The 70th drove onto high ground overlooking Saarbrücken, smashed into Forbach, took Stiring-Wendel, and continued across the Saar to take Saarbrücken, 20 March 1945. Pushing through Siegfried Line defenses along the north bank of the Saar, the division took Völklingen and other Saarland cities and towns. On 31 March it was reassigned to the Third Army. In April it took part in the reduction of the Saar Basin, and after VE-day was engaged in occupational duties, with command posts at Otterberg, Bad Kreuznach, Frankfurt, and Oranienstein in Germany.

Casualties
Total battle casualties: 3,919
Killed in action: 755
Wounded in action: 2,713
Missing in action: 54
Prisoner of war: 397

Assignments in ETO

20 December 1944: Seventh Army, 6th Army Group.
28 December 1944: VI Corps.
3 February 1945: XV Corps.
25 February 1945: XXI Corps.
22 March 1945: Seventh Army, 6th Army Group.
31 March 1945: 12th Army Group.
8 April 1945: Third Army, 12th Army Group.

Cold War

In 1952 it was allotted to the Organized Reserve Corps, now known as the Army Reserve. Later the same year the 70th was redesignated as the 70th Division (Training). It remained in Detroit until 1968, when it was moved to Livonia, Mich. The 70th Division (Training) was formally inactivated in Michigan on 15 Nov. 1996. The very next day, the 70th Regional Support Command was activated at Fort Lawton, Wash., bringing the name of the 70th back to the Northwest

In 1979 the command was redesignated as the 70th Regiment (Infantry One Station Unit Training), 70th Division (Training). During Desert Storm in 1991 the 70th took over Infantry School operations at Fort Benning, Georgia.  The command was formally inactivated in Michigan on 15 Nov. 1996 and the 124th Army Reserve Command (ARCOM) adopted the division title and history the next day. In 2000 the 70th Regional Support Command became the 70th Regional Readiness Command and began developing a history and relationship with the 70th ID soldiers and association.

Based upon the 2005 BRAC recommendations, Fort Lawton was closed and the 70th Regional Support Command deactivated in 2009.

General
Nickname: Trailblazers.
Shoulder patch: Red, in shape of axe-blade with white axe-head superimposed on red background; below the axe, in white is a replica of Oregon's Mount Hood, beside which is a green fir tree.  The green fir tree symbolizes the 91st Infantry Division from which officers and NCOs of the 70th were drawn prior to its activation.

See also
 289th Engineer Combat Battalion (United States)
 549th Engineer Light Ponton Company
 Bernard W. Rogers

References

The Army Almanac: A Book of Facts Concerning the Army of the United States U.S. Government Printing Office, 1950 reproduced at http://www.history.army.mil/html/forcestruc/cbtchron/cbtchron.html.
70th Infantry Division Association.

External links
 Trailblazers: The Story of the 70th Infantry Division

070th Infantry Division, U.S.
Infantry Division, U.S. 070
Infantry divisions of the United States Army in World War II
Military units and formations established in 1943
Military units and formations disestablished in 1945